Mount Vancouver is the 15th highest mountain in North America. Its southern side lies in Glacier Bay National Park and Preserve at the top of the Alaska panhandle, while its northern side is in Kluane National Park and Reserve in the southwestern corner of Yukon, Canada. Mount Vancouver has three summits: north, middle, and south, with the middle summit being the lowest.

The mountain was named by William Healey Dall in 1874 after George Vancouver, who explored the southeast coast of Alaska from 1792 to 1794.

Notable Ascents
1949 North Buttress (northwest ridge): FA of mountain by William Hainsworth, Alan Bruce-Robertson, Bob McCarter, Noel Odell; with Walter Wood in support.
1975 Northeast Ridge (to north peak), FA by Cliff Cantor, Bob Dangel, Paul Ledoux, Rob Milne, Hal Murray, Bob Walker, John Yates and Barton DeWolf.
1977 West Face, FA by John Lauchlan, John Calvert, Trevor Jones and Mike Sawyer.

See also

List of mountain peaks of North America
List of mountain peaks of Canada
List of mountain peaks of the United States
List of Boundary Peaks of the Alaska-British Columbia/Yukon border

References 

Sources

External links

 Mount Vancouver photo: Flickr

Mountains of Alaska
Four-thousanders of Yukon
Saint Elias Mountains
Mountains of Yakutat City and Borough, Alaska
Kluane National Park and Reserve
Canada–United States border
International mountains of North America
Mount Vancouver